Dominic Harington (born 4 June 1984) is an English snowboarder. He competed at the 2014 Winter Olympics in Sochi.

References

External links

1984 births
Snowboarders at the 2014 Winter Olympics
Living people
Olympic snowboarders of Great Britain
English male snowboarders
Place of birth missing (living people)
21st-century English people